Edwards Lake is a reservoir in the U.S. state of Georgia.

Edwards Lake was named after Harry Stillwell Edwards, the original owner of the site.

References

Reservoirs in Georgia (U.S. state)
Bodies of water of Bibb County, Georgia